Badara Mbengue (born 2 February 1966) is a retired Senegalese long jumper.

He finished fifth at the 1989 Jeux de la Francophonie, won the bronze medal at the 1989 African Championships and silver medal at the 1990 African Championships. He also competed at the 1987 and 1991 World Championships without reaching the final.

His personal best jump was 8.04 metres.

References

1966 births
Living people
Senegalese male long jumpers
World Athletics Championships athletes for Senegal